Chris Rossouw may refer to:
Chris Rossouw (rugby union born 1976), South Africa rugby union fly-half
Chris Rossouw (rugby union born 1969), South African rugby union hooker